Quarona is a comune (municipality) in the Province of Vercelli in the Italian region Piedmont, located about  northeast of Turin and about  north of Vercelli, along the Sesia River.

References

External links
 Official website
 A site on Quarona